"Body Talk" is a song written and recorded by American heavy metal band Ratt. The song is primarily written by Ratt's bassist Juan Croucier. Ratt's guitarist Warren DeMartini had the song's opening riffs for years. However, no one was able to develop it into a song. Under a very tight deadline (one day to be exact), Ratt bassist Juan Croucier stepped in. He wrote all the vocal melodies and lyrics, adding additional chord progressions to the one riff that had been around for years. The song title was apparently conceived of by Ratt producer Beau Hill or vocalist Stephen Pearcy.

It appears as the fifth track of their third full-length album Dancing Undercover and the eleventh track of their compilation album Ratt & Roll 81-91. It was also used as a soundtrack for Eddie Murphy's film The Golden Child. The video was added on MTV in late '86, while "Dance" was still in heavy rotation. The song was written by Ratt vocalist Stephen Pearcy, bassist Juan Croucier and guitarist Warren DeMartini.

Track listing (Japan)
 "Body Talk"
 "Slip of the Lip"

In the US, only promo singles of each track were issued separately.

Personnel
 Stephen Pearcy - vocals
 Warren DeMartini - co-lead guitar
 Robbin Crosby - co-lead guitar
 Juan Croucier - bass
 Bobby Blotzer - drums

References

Ratt songs
1986 singles
Song recordings produced by Beau Hill
Songs written by Stephen Pearcy
Songs written by Juan Croucier
Songs written by Warren DeMartini
1986 songs